In enzymology, a NAD+ diphosphatase is an enzyme that catalyzes the chemical reaction

NAD+ + H2O  AMP + NMN

Thus, the two substrates of this enzyme are NAD+ and H2O, whereas its two products are AMP and NMN.

This enzyme belongs to the family of hydrolases, specifically those acting on acid anhydrides in phosphorus-containing anhydrides.  The systematic name of this enzyme class is NAD+ phosphohydrolase. Other names in common use include nicotinamide adenine dinucleotide pyrophosphatase, NADP+ pyrophosphatase, and NADH pyrophosphatase.  This enzyme participates in nicotinate and nicotinamide metabolism.

Structural studies

As of late 2007, only one structure has been solved for this class of enzymes, with the PDB accession code .

References

 
 

EC 3.6.1
NADH-dependent enzymes
Enzymes of known structure